This Mortal Coil were a British music collective led by Ivo Watts-Russell, founder of the British record label 4AD. Although Watts-Russell and John Fryer were the only two official members, the band's recorded output featured a large rotating cast of supporting artists, many of whom were otherwise associated with 4AD, including members of Cocteau Twins, Pixies and Dead Can Dance. The project became known for its gothic, dream pop sound, and released three full albums, beginning in 1984 with It'll End in Tears.

Background
Watts-Russell had founded 4AD in 1980, and the label established itself as one of the key labels in the British post-punk movement. Following several releases, Watts-Russell developed the idea of collaborating under the name This Mortal Coil. The name is taken from lyrics to the song Dream Within A Dream by Spirit ("...Stepping off this mortal coil will be my pleasure..."), which in turn is a quote from Shakespeare's Hamlet ("... what dreams may come, when we have shuffled off this mortal coil...").

The 4AD website said:

One of the label's earliest signings was Modern English. In 1983, Watts-Russell suggested that the band re-record two of its earliest songs, "Sixteen Days" and "Gathering Dust", as a medley. At the time, the band was closing its set with this medley, and Watts-Russell felt it was strong enough to warrant a re-recording. When the band rebuffed the idea, Watts-Russell decided to assemble a group of musicians to record the medley: Elizabeth Fraser and Robin Guthrie of Cocteau Twins; Cindy Sharp of Cindytalk; and a few members of Modern English. An EP, Sixteen Days/Gathering Dust, resulted from these sessions. A cover of Tim Buckley's "Song to the Siren", performed by Fraser and Guthrie alone, was recorded as a B-side for the EP. Pleased with the results, Watts-Russell decided to make this the A-side of the 7" single version of the EP, and the song quickly became an underground hit, leading Watts-Russell to pursue the recording of a full album under the This Mortal Coil moniker, 1984's It'll End in Tears.

In June 1998, Watts-Russell began releasing albums in a similar vein to his TMC projects, under the name The Hope Blister.

Discography

Albums

Studio albums

Compilation albums

Box sets

EPs

Singles

Contributions
 "Acid, Bitter and Sad" on Lonely Is an Eyesore (1987)

References

External links
This Mortal Coil on 4AD website
[ This Mortal Coil at allmusic.com]
This Mortal Coil at trouserpress.com

Musical groups established in 1983
Musical groups disestablished in 1991
Dream pop musical groups
English post-punk music groups
English gothic rock groups
British supergroups
Ethereal wave musical groups
4AD artists
Rock music supergroups
1983 establishments in the United Kingdom